The 2005 season of the Palau Soccer League was the second season of association football competition in Palau. Team Bangladesh won the championship, their first title.

References

Palau Soccer League seasons
Palau
Soccer